Un homme libre is the second studio album from French male model and singer Baptiste Giabiconi. It was released on 2 June 2014 on Be 1st Music / Smart record label, an affiliate of Sony Music. Contrary to his debut album that was mainly in English, this album is an all French language album destined to French-speaking markets and contains 12 tracks. It peaked at #44 on the SNEP official French Albums Chart.

Track listing
"Je te aime" (2:46)
"Je t'emmène avec moi" (3:12)
"Demain" (3:21)
"Le monde sera vert" (2:38)
"Nos jours meilleurs" (3:35)
"Petit ange" (3:29)
"Embrasse-moi" (3:12)
"C'est ta route" (2:33)
"Je t'adore" (3:08)
"Un homme libre" (2:33)
"La fille d'hiver" (2:51)
"Elle est celle" (2:33)

Charts

References

2014 albums
Baptiste Giabiconi albums